The Cuba national under-18 basketball team is a national basketball team of Cuba, administered by the Federación Cubana de Baloncesto.

It represents the country in international under-18 (under age 18) basketball competitions.

See also
Cuba men's national basketball team
Cuba women's national under-19 basketball team

References

External links
 Archived records of Cuba team participations

U-19
Men's national under-18 basketball teams
Basketball